Farez Brahmia (born 24 January 1990 in Saint-Louis)is a French football player of Algerian origin who is currently playing as a right wing midfielder for Championnat National 2 side FC Mulhouse.

Club career
In 2003, Brahmia joined the junior ranks of local side RC Strasbourg. In 2008, he was a member of Strasbourg's Under-18 team that reached the semi-finals of the Coupe Gambardella before losing to eventual champions Rennes.

At the start of the 2009-2010 season, although he only had an amateur contract, Brahmia was promoted to the Strasbourg first team. On 2 October 2009 he made his professional debut for RC Strasbourg, starting in a Ligue 2 game against Angers SCO. On 15 January 2010 he scored his first league goal for Strasbourg in a 4-1 win over Stade Lavallois. On 21 April 2010 Brahmia signed a three-year contract with the club.

References

External links

Living people
1990 births
French footballers
French sportspeople of Algerian descent
Sportspeople from Haut-Rhin
RC Strasbourg Alsace players
SR Colmar players
Lyon La Duchère players
US Sarre-Union players
FC Mulhouse players
Ligue 2 players
Championnat National players
Championnat National 2 players
Championnat National 3 players
Association football midfielders